Clermont Sans Fil (formerly Bougnat Sans Fil) is or was a nonprofit association which operates a WiFi community network to provide wireless Internet access in Clermont-Ferrand in Puy-de-Dôme, France. The Bougnat Sans Fil website now indicates that Bougnat Sans Fil's is now managed by Noodo. The Clermont Sans Fil website  has been replaced by a Japanese-language website.

References 
Info Clermont, May 2006 – Le wi-fi à la conquête de Clermont
Modergnat mai 2006 – Jardin sans fil, l'internet démocratisé
Demain Clermont Avril 2006 – Zoom sur l’association Bougnat sans fil – Internet sans fil à la portée de tous
La Montagne 22 mars 2006 – Quand le sans fil s'en mêle : Si le Puy-de-Dôme recensait déjà 42 hotspots, dont 18 à Clermont-Ferrand, l'accès au Wifi n'en était pas pour autant gratuit! Mais quand "Bougnat Sans Fil" change la donne

External links 
 Clermont Sans Fil 2007 archive at the Wayback Machine

 Sans Fil Consulted May 20, 2006

Wireless community networks
Clermont-Ferrand